Bulgarian Jews in Israel are Jewish immigrants and descendants of the immigrants of the Bulgarian Jewish communities, who now reside within the state of Israel. They number around 75,000 in the wider definition, and 7,500 in the narrower scope (those with Bulgarian citizenship).

History
After the establishment of the state of Israel, most of the Bulgarian Jewish population left for Israel, leaving only about a thousand Bulgarian Jews living in Bulgaria today (1,162 according to the 2011 census). According to Israeli government statistics, 43,961 people from Bulgaria emigrated to Israel between 1948 and 2006, making Bulgarian Jews in Israel the fourth largest group to come from a European country, after the Soviet Union, Romania and Poland.
The current population estimates are 48,900 Jews born or with a father born in Bulgaria or Greece. 32,000 Jews with a Bulgarian- or Greek-born father. 17,000 Bulgarian- and Greek-born Jews.

Notable people
Binyamin Arditi
Gabi Ashkenazi
Menachem Ashkenazi
Michael Bar-Zohar
Shimon Bejarano
Albert Cohen 
Ya'akov Eilon
Moshe Gueron
Shlomo Kalo
Rafael Moshe Kamhi
Oshrat Kotler
Shabtai Konorti
Shmuel Levi
Yehuda Levi
Raphael Mechoulam
Moni Moshonov
Ya'akov Nehoshtan
Ya'akov Nitzani
Avraham Ofek
Israel Pincas
David Primo
Albert Salomon
Victor Shem-Tov
Rachamim Talbi
Rami Yosifov
Daniel Zion
Emanuel Zisman

See also 

Aliyah
History of the Jews in Bulgaria
Jewish ethnic divisions
Bulgaria–Israel relations

References 

 

 
Israeli Jews by national origin